Miles Normandale (born 21 September 1991) is an English rugby union player who plays for Rotherham Titans in the RFU Championship. He is also Welsh qualified through residency.

Normandale made his debut for the Cardiff Blues in 2013 having previously played for Cardiff Metropolitan University RFC where he also studied coaching.

References

External links 
Cardiff Blues Player Profile

1991 births
Living people
Rugby union players from Bristol
English rugby union players
Cardiff Rugby players
Rugby union locks